Cláudio Tavares may refer to:
Cláudio Tavares (rower) (born 1964), Brazilian rower
Cláudio Tavares (footballer) (born 1997), Cape Verdean footballer